Bereket railway station is the main railway station in the city of Bereket, Turkmenistan. It was built in 1885. The station is operated by the Türkmendemirýollary.

Bereket station is an important strategic railway crossroad on the Trans-Caspian Railway (Caspian Sea - Turkmenistan - Uzbekistan - Kazakhstan) and North-South Transnational Railway (Russia - Kazakhstan - Turkmenistan - Iran - Persian Gulf.

Bereket Railway Depot (or Bereket RD) is a railway depot in Bereket city where locomotives are serviced and maintained. It is one of the oldest and biggest MPDs in Turkmenistan. The Depot was built in 1889.

History 
The station was built in 1885. The station building was reconstructed in 2013.

See also 
 Railway stations in Turkmenistan
 Transport in Turkmenistan
 Trans-Caspian Railway
 Trans-Karakum Railway
 North-South Transnational Railway

References

Railway stations in Turkmenistan
Railway stations opened in 1885